Kapala is a village and rural commune in the Cercle of Sikasso in the Sikasso Region of southern Mali. The commune covers an area of 175 square kilometers and includes eight villages. In the 2009 census it had a population of 10,200. The village of Kapala is about 25 km south of Sikasso.

References

External links
.

Communes of Sikasso Region